Grace Dent (born 3 October 1973) is an English columnist, broadcaster and author. She is a restaurant critic for The Guardian and from 2011 to 2017 wrote a restaurant column for the Evening Standard. She is a regular critic on the BBC's MasterChef UK and has appeared on Channel 4's television series Very British Problems.

Dent has written 11 novels for teenagers, and her first non-fiction title How to Leave Twitter was published in July 2011.

Early life
Dent was born in Carlisle, Cumberland. She attended Bishop Harvey Goodwin Primary School in Currock, Carlisle, and studied English Literature at University of Stirling. While at university, she wrote features for Cosmopolitan after winning a place on their Student Advisory panel.

Journalism
After graduation from Stirling University, Dent's first job was editorial assistant for Marie Claire magazine in London.

In 1998, she became a freelance journalist, contributing to Glamour, Cosmopolitan and Marie Claire, as well as writing a weekly column in More! magazine. From 1998 to 2000, she worked for the Daily Mirror, writing about international offbeat topics.

Dent began writing for The Guardian in 1999. She wrote "World of Lather", celebrating her love of Coronation Street and other soap operas, for the Guardians Guide supplement from 2001 to 2010. From 2010 to 2012, she wrote "Grace Dent's TV-OD". In 2012, she signed a joint deal with The Independent and the London Evening Standard. She became the restaurant critic of The Guardian in January 2018. In November 2017, Dent won 'Reviewer of the Year' at the London Restaurant Festival.

She has been "mainly vegan" since the early 2010s, describing herself as plant-based or a flexitarian.

Published works
Dent has written 11 novels. Her first, It's a Girl Thing, was published in 2003. She was shortlisted for the 2008 Queen of Teen Prize. Her first non-fiction title How To Leave Twitter (My Time as Queen of the Universe and Why This Must Stop) was published in July 2011.

In October 2008, Dent was part of the judging panel for the Young Minds book awards. 

She was a judge on the 2011 Roald Dahl Funny Prize.

LBD
Her first trilogy of novels was for Puffin Books.
 It's a Girl Thing (2003)
 The Great Escape (2004), also published under the title Live and Fabulous!
 Curse of the Mega Boobed Bimbos (2005), also published under the title Friends Forever!

Diary of a Chav
In 2006 the first Diary of a Chav novel Trainers v. Tiaras was released for Hodder Books.

 Trainers V. Tiaras (2007), (also published under the titles Diary of a Chav and Diva Without a Cause in America)
 Slinging the Bling (2007), (also published under the title Posh and Prejudice in America)
 Too Cool for School (2008)
 The Ibiza Diaries (2008), (later published under the titles Ibiza Nights and Lost in Ibiza)
 The Fame Diaries (2008), (later published under the title Fame and Fortune)
 Keeping It Real (2009), (also published under the title The Real Diaries)

Diary of a Snob
In December 2008, Dent signed a two-book deal with Hodder; Diary of a Snob was launched at Hay-on-Wye Literary Festival in June 2009. The rights were acquired for TV by Nickelodeon in March 2011, but were not developed.

 Poor Little Rich Girl (July 2009)
 Money Can't Buy Me Love (September 2010)

Hungry: A memoir of wanting more 
Published in October 2020, Hungry traces Grace’s story from growing up eating beige food to becoming one of the much-loved voices on the British food scene. It won the 2021 Lakeland Book of the Year.

Television and radio
Dent is a regular critic on Masterchef UK, Masterchef: The Professionals, and Celebrity Masterchef. She has also appeared as a judge on BBC Two's Great British Menu. She was the Creative Director for the Evening Standards London Food Month (2017) which won 'Best Debut Event' at the 2017 Event Awards.

She has appeared on many British television shows such as Very British Problems (Channel 4), Pointless Celebrities, The Apprentice: You're Fired, Have I Got News For You (BBC1), The Now Show (Radio 4), The Review Show (BBC Two), Film 2012 (BBC1), The Culture Show (BBC2), Charlie Brooker's Screenwipe (BBC4), Alan Davies: As Yet Untitled (Dave), and Richard Osman's House of Games (BBC2).

Since 2016, Dent has presented The Untold on BBC Radio 4. The series has been nominated twice for ARIA awards.

Over Christmas 2019, Dent sat in for Vanessa Feltz on BBC Radio 2.

References

External links

The Untold (BBC Radio 4)
World of Lather
TV OD

1973 births
Living people
Alumni of the University of Stirling
British newspaper journalists
British women journalists
English television critics
Women television critics
English women novelists
People from Carlisle, Cumbria
The Guardian journalists
British writers of young adult literature
I (newspaper) journalists
British women critics
British restaurant critics
Women writers of young adult literature
British monarchists